HMS Milford was a 74-gun third rate ship of the line of the Royal Navy, launched on 1 April 1809 at Milford Haven. She was designed by Jean-Louis Barrallier as a large class 74, and was the only ship built to her draught. As a large 74, she carried 24 pdrs on her upper gun deck, instead of the 18 pdrs found on the middling and common class 74s.

Milford was placed on harbour service in 1825, and was broken up in 1846.

Notes

References

Lavery, Brian (2003) The Ship of the Line - Volume 1: The development of the battlefleet 1650-1850. Conway Maritime Press. .

Ships of the line of the Royal Navy
1809 ships